Carman Lee Yeuk-tung (born 16 August 1966) is a Hong Kong actress who has appeared in films such as The Wicked City (1992), Loving You (1995), The Odd One Lives (1997), and the North American Knock Off (1998) with Jean-Claude Van Damme. She is best known for her role as Xiaolongnü in the 1995 TV series adaptation of Louis Cha's wuxia novel The Return of the Condor Heroes.

Filmography

Television

Films

References

External links

Hong Kong film actresses
Hong Kong television actresses
Living people
1966 births